Goneda is a village in Kirlampudi mandal, Kakinada district, within the state of Andhra Pradesh, India.

Villages in Kirlampudi mandal